"Sobre Crianças, Quadris, Pesadelos e Lições de Casa..." is the second studio album by the Brazilian rapper Emicida. The album was released on August 7, 2015, by the independent label Laboratório Fantasma.

Track listing

References

2015 albums
Emicida albums